The ARCA Mobile 200 was an ARCA Racing Series presented by Menards race held at the Mobile International Speedway in Irvington, Alabama. With the inaugural event occurring in 2012, the race was removed from the calendar after the 2015 season.

Past winners 

2014 and 2015: Race was extended due to a Green-white-checkered finish.

External links 
Racing-Reference.info - Mobile International Speedway

2012 establishments in Alabama
2015 disestablishments in Alabama
ARCA Menards Series races
Motorsport in Alabama
Recurring sporting events established in 2012
Recurring sporting events disestablished in 2015